Sylvester Wackerle (born 26 April 1937) is a German ice hockey player. He competed in the men's tournament at the 1964 Winter Olympics.

References

External links
 
 
 

1937 births
Living people
German ice hockey players
Olympic ice hockey players of Germany
Olympic ice hockey players of the United Team of Germany
Ice hockey players at the 1964 Winter Olympics
Sportspeople from Garmisch-Partenkirchen